David Christian Uron (born October 20, 1985) is an Indonesian footballer.

Honours

Club honors
Persipura Jayapura
Indonesia Super League (1): 2010–11

External links
 profile in Liga Indonesia Official Website 
 

1985 births
Living people
Indonesian Christians
Indonesian footballers
People from Wamena
Persiwa Wamena players
Persipura Jayapura players
Persiram Raja Ampat players
Liga 1 (Indonesia) players
Association football midfielders